Negro Factories Corporation was one of the business ventures of the Universal Negro Improvement Association and African Communities League recognized by 125 countries worldwide with its own Constitution and flag. The UNIA-ACL is a black nationalist fraternal organization founded in 1919 by Marcus Garvey, a North American Jamaican-born activist in New York.  It eventually had chapters on three continents and in the Caribbean.

The Negro Factories Corporation was intended to "build and operate factories in the big industrial centers of the United States, Central America, the West Indies and Africa to manufacture every marketable commodity." It was an effort for economic development within communities of African descent. Businesses included a chain of grocery stores, a restaurant, a steam laundry, a tailor and dressmaking shop, a millinery store and a publishing house. The UNIA had difficulty keeping the businesses going, and by the mid-1920s, many had closed.

References

African and Black nationalist organizations
African Americans' rights organizations
Pan-Africanist organizations